Tom Finn may refer to:

Tom Finn (cyclist), Irish cyclist
Tom Finn (singer), member of The Left Banke
Thomas Finn, an engineer killed in the St-Hilaire train disaster